Pingtung Airport are two airports in Pingtung City, Pingtung County, Taiwan . The airport is currently home to the Republic of China Air Force 6th Tactical Mixed Wing, and formerly offered commercial flights.

History 
Pingtung Airport was opened in November 1920 during Japan's rule over Taiwan. Originally, the base was used for "air policing", that is, the use of airplanes to govern indigenous peoples living in hard-to-reach areas. This practice ended in 1927 when the Imperial Japanese Army Air Service 8th Air Squadron was moved from Tachiarai, Fukuoka, to Pingtung. With further expansions and more military personnel moving in, Pingtung Airport served an important role in the Japanese military throughout the Japanese colonial era and the Pacific War.

After Japan's defeat in the Pacific War in 1945, the base came into the control of the Republic of China Air Force then jointly controlled by the RAF Far East Air Force from 1950 until 1991 and known as RAF Pingtung.

Commercial flights 
Between 1936 and 1942, Japan Air Transport and later Imperial Japanese Airways operated commercial flights to Taihoku Airfield (now Songshan Airport in Taipei).

In November 1993, Pingtung Airport opened for commercial flights again. Since the passenger terminal was not completed, the Pingtung Performing Arts Hall was used as the airport terminal and passengers were shuttled to and from the south airport. In February 1995, a small passenger building was completed at the south airport; in 2005, a larger passenger building was completed at the north airport. 

Originally, TransAsia Airways operated flights out of the airport until Uni Air took over in 2007. However, with the completion of Taiwan High Speed Rail in 2007, very few people took the flights anymore, and commercial flights ceased in August 2011.

See also
 Transportation in Taiwan
 List of airports in Taiwan

Notes

References

 
 
 

1920 establishments in Taiwan
Airports in Pingtung County